Alison Mary Blake  is a British diplomat who is currently serving as Governor of the Falkland Islands and Commissioner of South Georgia and the South Sandwich Islands. She previously served as High Commissioner to Bangladesh and Ambassador to Afghanistan.

Career
Blake was educated at Roan School for Girls and Merton College, Oxford, where she gained a MA degree in ancient and modern history in 1980. She worked as an archaeologist for the Museum of London, English Heritage and the Greater London Council from 1983 to 1987. 

She joined the Ministry of Defence in 1989 and for a period served as assistant private secretary to the Secretary of State for Defence. She left the MOD in 1995 and transferred to the Foreign and Commonwealth Office (FCO) and was at the UK delegation to NATO in Brussels 1996–99; deputy head of the Eastern Adriatic Department at the FCO 1999–2001; at the embassy in Washington, D.C., 2001–05; on secondment to the Cabinet Office as Head of Foreign and Development Policy 2006–07; head of the Conflict Group at the FCO 2007–11; deputy High Commissioner to Pakistan 2011–14. She became High Commissioner to Bangladesh in January 2016 where, in 2017, she received some criticism for apparently lobbying on behalf of British American Tobacco who was at that time in a dispute with the Bangladeshi government over a £170m claim for unpaid VAT brought by the government of Bangladesh against its subsidiary, BATB. She then moved in May 2019 to become Ambassador to Afghanistan. She was succeeded by Sir Laurie Bristow in June 2021.

Blake was appointed a Companion of the Order of St. Michael and St. George (CMG) in the 2018 New Year Honours "for services to British foreign and security policy."

In March 2022 the Foreign, Commonwealth & Development Office announced that Blake would be the new Governor of the Falkland Islands and Commissioner for South Georgia and the South Sandwich Islands, succeeding Nigel Phillips in July 2022. She is the first female governor of the islands.

References

|-

|-

Living people
People educated at the John Roan School
Alumni of Merton College, Oxford
British women ambassadors
High Commissioners of the United Kingdom to Bangladesh
Ambassadors of the United Kingdom to Afghanistan
Governors of the Falkland Islands
Commissioners for South Georgia and the South Sandwich Islands
Companions of the Order of St Michael and St George
Year of birth missing (living people)
Fellows of Merton College, Oxford